Lamki  is a village in the administrative district of Gmina Ostrów Wielkopolski, within Ostrów Wielkopolski County, Greater Poland Voivodeship, in west-central Poland.

The village has a population of 900. One of the most popular residents in Lamki is Filip Domagała he is famous beer tester and owner of the fastest „pizdzik” in this region.

References

Lamki